María Esperanza Rodríguez Escario (born 18 December 1959) is a Spanish journalist and presenter on Televisión Española (TVE). In the mid-1980s she was one of the pioneers in Spanish women's sports journalism. Since then she has covered seven Summer Olympic Games and three World Cups. She is known for her work to increase the visibility of women's sports.

Career
With a degree in journalism from the Complutense University of Madrid, María Escario began her career at a production company making educational videos for schools.

For 21 uninterrupted years, until 2014, she worked on the different editions of Telediario.

Since 1989, she has been a pioneer in Spanish sports journalism, along with Olga Viza and Elena Sánchez. When she got to the sports office – she explained in one of her interviews – she started by covering rhythmic gymnastics since "star" sports were taken over by men.

Since September 2014, Escario has been in charge of making reports related to the world of sports on "Enfoque", a micro segment included in the second edition of La 1's Telediario (TD2), which deals with various topics in depth.

In February 2012 she was admitted to the hospital as the result of a stroke. This kept her off the air for several months until she returned in May.

In 2013, she received the Ondas Award for best presenter.

In 2014 she was awarded the TENA Lady Award for Successful Women for being one of the first women to specialize in sportscasting, to value the work of a journalist who has served to open the way for other professionals in a traditionally masculine world, and for promoting and making visible women's sports and equality between men and women.

From 2005 to 2015 she was a jury member of the Princess of Asturias Awards for Sports.

Women and sports
In her professional career Escario has especially stood out in the defense of the visibility and equality of women's sports.

In 2014, during the delivery of the 2nd TENA Lady Award, she stated:

Specifically, she was awarded in the audiovisual category for the report "Rugby: el rugido de las leonas", broadcast on the TVE segment "Enfoque", about the women's national rugby team.

Awards and recognitions
 2011: Silver Medal for Sports Merit from the Sports Council
 2013: Ondas Award for best presenter
 2014: TENA Lady Award
 2015: Joan Ramón Mainat Award of the FesTVal de Televisión
 2017: We Are All Students Award from the Movistar Student Club
 2017:  Award in the category of "Communication committed to women"
 2017: First Lilí Álvarez Award from the Women's Institute and the Sports Council

References

External links

 

1959 births
Complutense University of Madrid alumni
Living people
People from Madrid
Spanish sports broadcasters
Spanish television presenters
Spanish women's rights activists
Women sports journalists
Spanish women journalists
Spanish women television presenters